is a Japanese baseball player. He won a bronze medal at the 1992 Summer Olympics, and has been a coach for Japan at international level.

External links
Hirotami Kojima Biography and Olympic Results | Olympics at Sports-Reference.com

Baseball players at the 1992 Summer Olympics
Olympic baseball players of Japan
Asian Games baseball managers
People from Tokyo
1964 births
Living people
Olympic medalists in baseball

Medalists at the 1992 Summer Olympics
Olympic bronze medalists for Japan